The 1968 Mississippi State Bulldogs football team represented Mississippi State University during the 1968 NCAA University Division football season. The Bulldogs finished winless on the year, although they did manage to tie two teams that finished with winning records, including rival Ole Miss, led by star quarterback Archie Manning.

Schedule

References

Mississippi State
Mississippi State Bulldogs football seasons
Mississippi State Bulldogs football